Darreh Qahti (also Romanized as Darreh Qaḥṭī; also known as Darreh Qa‘ţī) is a village in Miankuh Rural District, Miankuh District, Ardal County, Chaharmahal and Bakhtiari Province, Iran. At the 2006 census, its population was 155, in 31 families.

References 

Populated places in Ardal County